Pedro Diogo Tavares Martins de Oliveira (also Pedro Oliveira, born January 1, 1988) is a Portuguese swimmer, who specialized in backstroke and butterfly events. He is a two-time Olympian (2008 and 2012), and a double silver medalist in the 200 m backstroke at the European Junior Championships (2005 and 2006). He also holds four Portuguese records, two national titles, and has produced a stellar performance at the NCAA Swimming  Championships, earning five All-American titles as a member of Louisville Cardinals.

Swimming career

Early years
Oliveira, the son of Antonio and Albertina Oliveira, started his sporting career as a member of Rio Maior Swimming Club under his coach Vladimir Smirnoff. Oliveira competed at the 2005 and 2006 European Junior Swimming Championships in Budapest, Hungary and in Palma de Mallorca, Spain, where he earned two silver medals each in the 200 m backstroke.

After graduating from Augusto Cesar da Silva Ferreira School in Rio Maior, Oliveira accepted an athletic scholarship at the University of Louisville in Louisville, Kentucky, where he majored in exercise science (Human Health and Performance) and swam for the Louisville Cardinals swimming and diving team under head coach Arthur Albeiro.
While swimming for the Cardinals, he received five All-American titles, multiple Big East conference individual titles and records, also achieving two school records in the 200 fly and 200 backstroke. Eventually, Oliveira served as the team's co-captain for the 2012 NCAA Men's Swimming and Diving Championships during his last collegiate season, leading the team to their first top 10 finish.

International career
In 2007, Oliveira made his official debut as a senior swimmer at the FINA World Championships in Melbourne, Australia. He failed to reach the top 8 final in the 200 m backstroke, finishing in fourteenth place with a time of 2:01.18. Earlier in the prelims, Oliveira set a new Portuguese record of 2:00.62 to guarantee a slot for the semifinals.

At the 2008 European Aquatics Championships in Eindhoven, Netherlands, Oliveira experimented with the 200 m butterfly, where he posted a lifetime best of 1:59.00 in his semifinal run, sinking Diogo Carvalho's Portuguese record by 0.67 of a second.

Four months later, at the 2008 Summer Olympics in Beijing, Oliveira failed to reach the top 16 in any of his individual events, finishing twenty-fourth (with a new national record) in the 200 m butterfly (1:57.41), and twenty-eighth in the 200 m backstroke (2:01.08).

At the 2009 FINA World Championships in Rome, Italy, Oliveira maintained his official lineup in the program, swimming only in two individual events. In the 200 m butterfly, Oliveira broke a new Portuguese record of 1:56.17 to secure his semifinal spot with an advantage of a polyurethane swimsuit, slashing off Carvalho's standard by a 0.65-second deficit. In his second and final event, 200 m backstroke, Oliveira could not match his stellar performance from the butterfly, finishing thirty-second in the prelims with a time of 2:01.49.

In 2010, Oliveira reached his breakthrough in swimming, when he claimed a 200-metre butterfly title at the USA Swimming Grand Prix in Austin, Texas with a time of 1:59.02. His unexpected triumph from the meet moved him up to sixth in the world rankings.

In 2011, Oliveira decided to skip the World Championships to focus on his swimming career for the Louisville Cardinals. However, he later appeared in a global spotlight after earning a third spot in the 200 m butterfly (1:59.95) at the AT&T Winter National Championships in Atlanta, Georgia. Oliveira also competed for Portugal at the 2011 Summer Universiade in Shenzhen, China, where he placed ninth in the 200 m butterfly at 1:58.50, just missing out the final by a small fraction of a second.

At the 2012 Summer Olympics in London, Oliveira competed in the same individual events with only two days in between. He achieved FINA B-standards of 1:59.72 (200 m backstroke) from the European Championships in Debrecen, Hungary, and 1:58.50 (200 m butterfly) from the Summer Universiade in Shenzhen, China. In his first event, 200 m butterfly, Oliveira placed twenty-second on the morning preliminaries. He powered past the entire field to lead the second heat in a personal textile best of 1:58.45. Two days later, in the 200 m backstroke, Oliveira challenged seven other swimmers in the same heat, including Hungary's Gábor Balog, finalist at the European Championships. He set a new Portuguese record of 1:58.83 to earn a second spot behind Balog. Oliveira missed the top 16 semifinals by six-tenths of a second (0.60), as he placed twentieth in the prelims.

Three months after the Olympics, Oliveira placed sixth in the 200 m backstroke at the 2012 European Short Course Swimming Championships in Chartres, France in a Portuguese record of 1:53.06.

Personal bests
.

See also
 Louisville Cardinals
 List of Portuguese records in swimming

References

External links
Player Bio – Louisville Cardinals
NBC Olympics Profile
Athletes Profile – FINIS Inc.

1988 births
Living people
Portuguese male butterfly swimmers
Portuguese male backstroke swimmers
Swimmers at the 2008 Summer Olympics
Swimmers at the 2012 Summer Olympics
Olympic swimmers of Portugal
Louisville Cardinals men's swimmers
People from Rio Maior
Sportspeople from Santarém District
20th-century Portuguese people
21st-century Portuguese people